Matt Crouch (born 21 April 1995) is a professional Australian rules footballer playing for the Adelaide Football Club in the Australian Football League (AFL). He was recruited by the Adelaide Football Club with pick 23 in the 2013 national draft. He is the younger brother and former teammate of Brad Crouch.

AFL career
Crouch earned a nomination for the AFL Rising Star after having 28 disposals to three quarter time against , at which point he was substituted out of the game. In total Crouch played eight matches in his first year in the AFL, and averaged 33 possessions and 8 clearances in ten matches for Adelaide's reserves side, polling 12 votes in the Magarey Medal.

Crouch had an interrupted 2015 pre-season due to an ankle injury suffered just prior to Christmas. He recovered to have a breakout year, playing 17 games including Adelaide's two finals and averaging 21 possessions. At the end of the season he was rewarded with the club's Mark Bickley Emerging Talent Award. He also signed a three-year contract with Adelaide after the 2015 season, keeping him at the club until 2018.

In 2017, Crouch lifted his game to a new level, averaging 33 disposals per game and finishing second in the AFL for disposals after the regular season, and during the finals broke Dane Swan's AFL record for most disposals in a complete season with 825. He was selected in the 2017 All-Australian team and nominated by his club for the AFL Players Association MVP Award.

In late August 2017 he was named The Age's Player of the Year and won the Malcolm Blight Medal as Adelaide Football Club's best and fairest winner for 2017. In January 2018 Matthew re-signed with the Crows until the end of 2021.

Crouch sat out the 2021 AFL season due to a groin injury. After speculation that Matt Crouch would depart the Crows with his free agency rights, Crouch re-signed at Adelaide for two years, keeping him at the club until the end of 2023. Crouch returned to the AFL in round one of the 2022 AFL season against the Fremantle Dockers and did so with great success, collecting a cool 30 disposals.

Statistics
 Statistics are correct to end of 2021

|- style="background:#eaeaea;"
! scope="row" style="text-align:center" | 2014
| style="text-align:center" | 
| 44 || 8 || 3 || 2 || 63 || 69 || 132 || 26 || 26 || 0.4 || 0.3 || 7.9 || 8.6 || 16.5 || 3.3 || 3.3 || 0
|- 
! scope="row" style="text-align:center" | 2015
| style="text-align:center" | 
| 44 || 17 || 2 || 6 || 145 || 212 || 357 || 45 || 57 || 0.1 || 0.4 || 8.5 || 12.5 || 21.0 || 2.7 || 3.4 || 0
|- style="background:#eaeaea;"
! scope="row" style="text-align:center" | 2016
| style="text-align:center" | 
| 44 || 22 || 5 || 3 || 250 || 359 || 609 || 75 || 100 || 0.2 || 0.1 || 11.3 || 16.3 || 27.6 || 3.4 || 4.5 || 7
|- 
! scope="row" style="text-align:center" | 2017
| style="text-align:center" | 
| 44 || 25 || 7 || 7 || 345 || 480 || 825 || 76 || 119 || 0.3 || 0.3 || 13.8 || 19.2 || 33.0 || 3.0 || 4.8 || 11
|- style="background:#eaeaea;"
! scope="row" style="text-align:center" | 2018
| style="text-align:center" | 
| 5 || 18 || 2 || 3 || 249 || 331 || 580 || 69 || 70 || 0.1 || 0.2 || 13.8 || 18.4 || 32.2 || 3.8 || 3.9 || 8
|- 
! scope="row" style="text-align:center" | 2019
| style="text-align:center" | 
| 5 || 19 || 7 || 4 || 270 || 350 || 620 || 77 || 65 || 0.4 || 0.2 || 14.2 || 18.4 || 32.6 || 4.1 || 3.4 || 8
|- style="background:#eaeaea;"
! scope="row" style="text-align:center" | 2020
| style="text-align:center" | 
| 5 || 16 || 2 || 3 || 162 || 256 || 418 || 44 || 74 || 0.1 || 0.2 || 10.1 || 16.0 || 26.1 || 2.8 || 4.6 || 3
|-
! scope="row" style="text-align:center" | 2021
| style="text-align:center" | 
| 5 || 0 || - || - || - || - || - || - || - || - || - || - || - || - || - || - || -
|- style="background:#eaeaea;"
! scope="row" style="text-align:center" | 2022
| style="text-align:center" | 
| 5 || 1 || 0 || 0 || 22 || 37 || 59 || 8 || 9 || 0 || 0 || 11 || 18.5 || 29.5 || 4 || 4.5 || -
|- class="sortbottom"
! colspan=3| Career
! 125
! 28
! 28
! 1484
! 2057
! 3541
! 412
! 511
! 0.2
! 0.2
! 11.9
! 16.5
! 28.3
! 3.3
! 4.1
! 37
|}

References

External links

1995 births
Living people
Adelaide Football Club players
Greater Western Victoria Rebels players
Australian rules footballers from Ballarat
Adelaide Football Club (SANFL) players
North Ballarat Football Club players
All-Australians (AFL)
Malcolm Blight Medal winners